Aya Fujishiro (born 6 November 1974) is a former Japanese cricketer who played four Women's One Day International cricket matches for Japan national women's cricket team in 2003.

References

1974 births
Living people
Japanese women cricketers
Wicket-keepers